Maximilian Neville (born 29 April 2000) is an Irish cricketer. He made his Twenty20 cricket debut for Munster Reds in the 2017 Inter-Provincial Trophy on 26 May 2017. He made his first-class debut for Leinster Lightning in the 2017 Inter-Provincial Championship on 5 June 2017.

In December 2017, he was named in Ireland's squad for the 2018 Under-19 Cricket World Cup.

References

External links
 

2000 births
Living people
Irish cricketers
Leinster Lightning cricketers
Munster Reds cricketers
Cricketers from Dublin (city)